Gustavo César Mendonça Gravino (born 29 October 2001), commonly known as Gustavinho, is a Brazilian footballer who plays as a midfielder for Grêmio.

Club career
Born in Juiz de Fora, Minas Gerais, Gustavinho joined Cruzeiro's youth setup at the age of 13, from hometown side Sport Juiz de Fora. Released by the club in 2017, he stayed three months without a club before joining América Mineiro.

On 12 November 2020, Gustavinho renewed his contract until December 2022. He made his professional debut the following 9 January, coming on as a late substitute for Juninho in a 4–0 Série B home routing of Vitória.

Career statistics

References

External links
 

2001 births
Living people
People from Juiz de Fora
Brazilian footballers
Association football midfielders
Campeonato Brasileiro Série A players
Campeonato Brasileiro Série B players
América Futebol Clube (MG) players
Sportspeople from Minas Gerais